Kendrick Dwayne Shedd (born February 14, 1971) is a former American football wide receiver in the National Football League for the New York Jets, Chicago Bears, Oakland Raiders and the Washington Redskins. He also played a season in 1996 on the Barcelona Dragons in the World League of American Football. He played college football at the University of Northern Iowa and was named to the Missouri Valley Football Conference “All-Select NFL Team” in 2009.

Shedd graduated the police academy in 2002 and currently works in law enforcement in San Leandro, California.

External links
Former Raiders player a rookie police officer in San Leandro
Former Raider still gives arresting performance: Q&A with Kenny Shedd
Former Raiders Player Transitions To Arresting Career 09/2008
11 Former Panthers named to MVFC "All-Select NFL Team"
Missouri Valley Football Conference Recognizes “All-Select NFL Team”

1971 births
Living people
American football wide receivers
African-American players of American football
Northern Iowa Panthers football players
Barcelona Dragons players
Oakland Raiders players
Washington Redskins players
Players of American football from Iowa
Sportspeople from Davenport, Iowa
21st-century African-American sportspeople
20th-century African-American sportspeople